Kelly Block  (born November 30, 1961) is a Canadian politician representing the electoral district of Carlton Trail—Eagle Creek since 2015. She was first elected in the 2008 Canadian federal election to serve as the Member of Parliament for the Saskatoon—Rosetown—Biggar district. Prior to her election to the House of Commons, Block served two terms as mayor of Waldheim, Saskatchewan. Block was Waldheim's first female mayor, and also served as chairperson of the Gabriel Springs Health District.  Block was later appointed to the Saskatoon Regional Health Authority when the government of Saskatchewan amalgamated its health districts.  Block ran unsuccessfully for the Saskatchewan Party nomination for the provincial Martensville constituency by-election in November 2006 against Nancy Heppner.

Career

Block is a member of the Conservative Party. She was appointed to the Procedure and House Affairs Committee (PROC) and the Access to Information, Privacy and Ethics Committee (ETHI). In fall 2009, Block was moved from PROC and appointed to the budget and finance committee.  With the commencement of the 41st Parliament in 2011, Block was appointed to the health committee, and the government operations and estimates committee.  Block was also appointed by Prime Minister Stephen Harper to serve as the regional caucus chairperson for the Saskatchewan Conservative caucus.

Block was awarded the Maclean's Parliamentarian of the Year – Rising Star – Award in June 2010 after receiving the highest number of weighted votes from fellow parliamentarians of all parties.

In October 2012, Block sent out a flyer to her constituents entitled Ending Unfair Benefits for Refugee Claimants which criticized refugee claimants and rejected refugee applicants access to extended healthcare benefits. She was criticized in the media and Parliament for the newsletter. Block defended the message but said the content was a draft, and expressed regret about some of the language used.

Following the 2013 redrawing of Saskatchewan's federal electoral boundaries, Block stated she would run in the new riding of Humboldt-Warman-Martensville-Rosetown (later renamed Carlton Trail-Eagle Creek).

In September 2013, Block was appointed Parliamentary Secretary for the Ministry of Natural Resources.

In the 2015 federal election, won by the Liberal Party, Block was elected in the redrawn riding of Carlton Trail—Eagle Creek. She was appointed as the Conservative critic for Transport by interim leader Rona Ambrose.

In 2019, Block was re-elected with an increased margin and the fourth-highest voter turnout in the election. She was appointed as the Opposition critic for Public Services and Procurement Canada by Conservative Leader Andrew Scheer.

Block was elected Chair of the Standing Committee on Public Accounts On October 15, 2020.

In February 2021, Kelly Block introduced the Protection of Freedom of Conscience Act.

Electoral record

References

External links
 
 

1961 births
Women members of the House of Commons of Canada
Conservative Party of Canada MPs
Living people
Mayors of places in Saskatchewan
Members of the House of Commons of Canada from Saskatchewan
Politicians from Saskatoon
Women mayors of places in Saskatchewan
21st-century Canadian politicians
21st-century Canadian women politicians